Put the "O" Back in Country is the debut studio album by American country rock artist Shooter Jennings. This album was released on March 1, 2005 on the Universal South label.

This album produced Jennings's only entry on the Billboard Hot Country Songs charts in the single "4th of July". The album version of this song features a cameo appearance by George Jones, who sings the chorus to his signature song "He Stopped Loving Her Today" at the end; this guest appearance was removed from the song's radio edit. Despite the edit, Jones was credited on the Billboard charts.

Composition 

The music of Put the "O" Back in Country encompasses Southern rock, country rock and outlaw country.

Track listing

Personnel
Shooter Jennings – lead vocals, backing vocals, acoustic guitar, Dobro, electric guitar, grand piano, harmonica, Hammond organ, Wurlitzer
Jessi Colter – backing vocals on "Southern Comfort"
Faith Evans – backing vocals on "Southern Comfort"
Eric Heywood – pedal steel guitar on "Solid Country Gold" and "Manifesto No. 1"
George Jones – duet vocals on "4th of July"
Ted Russell Kamp – bass guitar, piano, backing vocals
Bryan Keeling – drums
Chris Lawrence – pedal steel guitar on "Lonesome Blues"
Travis Roy Parker – fiddle on "Busted in Baylor County"
LeRoy Powell – lap steel guitar, acoustic guitar, electric guitar, 12-string guitar, slide guitar, banjo, Dobro, strings, harmonica, backing vocals
CeCe White – backing vocals on "Southern Comfort"
Hank Williams Jr. – backing vocals

Charts

Weekly charts

Year-end charts

References

2005 debut albums
Shooter Jennings albums
Show Dog-Universal Music albums
Albums produced by Dave Cobb